Russian State Film and Photo Archive, also known as Russian State Documentary Film and Photo Archive, or Krasnogorsk Archive, or simply RGAKFD, is an archive of documentary newsreels and photographs located at Krasnogorsk, Moscow Oblast, Russia. The archive contains more than 1 million photos and has a virtually complete collection of newsreels from 1919 to 1985 that documents the political, military and other diverse episodes of the USSR.

See also
State Archive of the Russian Federation

External links
The Russian State Documentary Film & Photo Archive at Krasnogorsk (RGAKFD)
Russian newsreels and documentary films – online film catalogue
Archive history (PBS.org)
Russian Archives Online: perspectives of development

Photo archives in Russia
Cultural heritage monuments of federal significance in Moscow Oblast
Krasnogorsky District, Moscow Oblast